Mohamed Marhoum (born 1 July 1990) is a Sudanese professional footballer who plays as a forward.

External links 
 

1990 births
Living people
Sudanese footballers
Association football forwards
Sudan international footballers